The School of Communication and Information (SC&I) is a professional school within the New Brunswick Campus of Rutgers, The State University of New Jersey. The school was created in 1982 as a result of a merger between the Graduate School of Library and Information Studies, the School of Communication Studies, and the Livingston Department of Urban Journalism. The school has about 2,500 students at the undergraduate, masters, and doctoral levels, and about 60 full-time faculty.

The graduate program in information has been ranked number 7 in the nation, with the specialization in school library media ranked 2nd and several other specializations in the top ten, by U.S. News & World Report.

History

Although SC&I was established in 1982, the roots of the academic programs housed at the school date back to the 1920s.

1926 Undergraduate program in Journalism established at Rutgers College

1927 Undergraduate program in librarianship established at the New Jersey College for Women, later Douglass College. This became defunct two decades later.

1953 Graduate School of Library Service (GSLS) opens its doors to its first class of master’s students.

1971 Undergraduate major in Communication established

1978 Name of the GSLS changes to Graduate School of Library and Information Studies

1982 School of Communication, Information and Library Studies is established. At the time of its inception, the school offered two undergraduate majors (Communication, Journalism and Mass Media), a master's degree in Library Service, and established an interdisciplinary doctoral program

1983 Names of the departments are denoted as Department of Communication, Department of Journalism and Mass Media, and Department of Library and Information Studies

1987 Master of Communication and Information Studies established

2001 Undergraduate major in Information Technology and Informatics begins accepting students

2005 Online Master of Library and Information Science program admits its first students

2009 Name changed from School of Communication, Information and Library Studies to School of Communication and Information.

Academic departments

Communication

Students and faculty in the Department of Communication study the nature and effects of communication on individuals, social groups, and society, including the ways in which communication is practiced in everyday life and the choices about communication that affect individuals and their situation. This program was founded as an undergraduate program in 1971.

Organizational communication, mediated communication, language and social interaction, and interpersonal communication are primary areas of faculty research with change, collaboration, culture, health, gender, globalization, identity, leadership, persuasion, policy, and relationship development prominent problem-centered research foci across areas.

Department Chair

Craig R. Scott

Journalism and Media Studies

The Department of Journalism and Media Studies is concerned with the relationships among media texts, institutions, and audiences, especially in the way that media and society affect each other politically, culturally, and socially. This includes study of both the “traditional” mass media and newer electronic technologies and telecommunications. The Journalism and Media Studies program was founded in 1926.

Research examines media content and effects; audience reception and interpretive processes; the emergence of audiences understood in terms of race, age, gender, class, and politics; the sociology and production of culture; communication law, regulation, and policy; and the media’s roles in political and international communication and in educational systems.

Department Chair

Susan Keith

Library and Information Science

The Department of Library and Information Science focuses on the role of information in personal, social, institutional, national, and international contexts. Research of information-seeking activity, information retrieval systems, and information structures are core interests. These research interests involve considerations of design, management, and evaluation of information systems and services along with the development and assessment of tools responsive to the information needs of users. Digital libraries, school libraries and youth services, knowledge management, and information personalization are areas of notable emphasis within the department. The program was founded in 1927.

Department Chair

Marie L. Radford

Centers and Labs

Center for Communication and Health Issues

CHI is a consortium of educators, counselors and students with a mission to conduct research on communication and health issues affecting college students and to design, implement and evaluate campus and community-based education, intervention and prevention programs. It was founded in 1997 by Communication Professors Linda C. Lederman and Lea P. Stewart, Health educators Richard Powell and Fern Goodhart, and substance abuse counselor Lisa Laitman, as an ongoing collaboration.

Center for International Scholarship in School Libraries (CISSL)

The Center for International Scholarship (CISSL) dedicated to research, scholarship, education and consultancy for school library professionals. It focuses on how learning in an information age school is enabled and demonstrated by school library programs, and how inquiry-based learning and teaching processes can contribute to educational success and workplace readiness for learners. CISSL’s Director is Professor Carol Kuhlthau and Professor Ross Todd is Director of Research.

Center for Language, Interaction and Health (CLIH)

CLIH is a collaborative scientific community of interaction analysts dedicated to developing new insights into three key areas of social interaction: medical interaction, mental health interaction and family interactions related to food and nutrition. The Director of the Center is Alexa Hepburn and Co-Directors are Galina Bolden, Jenny Mandelbaum and Lisa Mikesell.

Center for Organizational Development and Leadership (ODL)

The Center for Organizational Development and Leadership serves as a resource to the university community in support of efforts to create a more service-oriented culture. Emphasis is placed on relationship building and "teaching in all we do" - inside and outside of the classroom. Education and instruction, consultation and facilitation, and research and development in organizational leadership are core focal areas.

NetSCI Lab

The NetSCI lab is dedicated to producing cutting edge networks research, advancing theories of social networks, methods for network analysis, and the practical application of networks research. Researchers in the lab are focused on the study of organizations and communities across multiple levels of interaction, connecting theory to practice, and informing the design of networks in everyday life.

SALTS Lab - Laboratory for the Study of Applied Language Technology and Society

SALTS, the Laboratory for the Study of Applied Language Technology and Society at the School of Communication and Information, Rutgers University, brings together researchers interested in developing and/or using next-generation natural language processing technology that supports communication across cultural and social boundaries in areas such as digital libraries, education, public health, humanities, linguistics and communication.

NETWORKS

Social Media and Society Cluster

The Social Media & Society Cluster is a transdisciplinary unit within Rutgers’ School of Communication and Information that supports research that extends across the boundaries of the i-School, communication, and media studies programs within the School.

Student organizations

African American Culture and Communication Association
Association for Information Science and Technology
Association of Black Journalists
Association for Women in Communications
Doctoral Student Association
Gamma Nu Eta (Information Technology Honor Society)
Information Technology and Informatics Council
International Association of Business Communicators
Kappa Tau Alpha (Journalism and Media Studies Honor Society)
Lambda Pi Eta (Communication Honor Society)
Library and Information Science Student Association (American Library Association Student Chapter)
Master of Communication and Information Graduate Student Association 
Public Relations Student Society of America
Rutgers Association of School Librarians
Rutgers University Debate Union
Society of Professional Journalists
Special Libraries Association
Student College, Academic, and Research Library Association
Student Organization for Unique and Rare Collections Everywhere

Core Faculty Members

Communication

Mark Aakhus  (Social Interaction, Organizational & Mediated Communication)
Mark Beal (Entertainment Communication, Social Media)
Galina Bolden  (Language & Social Interaction)
Erin Christie (Social Interaction, Organizational Communication)
Marya L. Doerfel  (Organizational Communication, Social Networks)
R. Richard Dool 
J. Sophia Fu (Organizational Communication)
Kathryn Greene  (Health Communication)
Alexa Hepburn (Health Communication)
Brian Householder
Vikki Katz  (Immigrant and Family Communication)
Jeffrey Lane  (Urban Ethnography, Mediated Communication and Communities)
Laurie Lewis  (Organizational Communication)
Nikolaos Linardopoulos  (Communication Education, Public Speaking)
Jenny Mandelbaum (Social Interaction, Conversational Analysis, Relationships, Identity, Interpersonal Communication)
Matthew Matsaganis (Organizational Communication, CCommunity-Based Research)
Lisa Mikesell  (Social Interaction, Health Communication)
Katherine Ognyanova (Computational social science and Network Analysis)
Jonathan Potter (Health Communication)
Brent Ruben (Organizational Communication)
Craig Scott  (Organizational Communication, Communication Technologies, Anonymous Communication)
Lea P. Stewart  (Health Communication, Communication and Gender, Communication Ethics)
Jennifer Theiss  (Interpersonal Communication, Relationship Development)
Itzhak Yanovitzky (Health Communication)

Journalism and Media Studies

Melissa Aronczyk  (Promotional Culture, Political and Cultural Interpretations of Globalization)
Neal Bennett 
Jack Bratich (Critical Cultural Studies, Social Political Theory, Popular Culture)
Carol Cassidy
Mary D'Ambrosio (Global Reporting; Humanizing our Media; Journalism Innovation)
Lauren Feldman  (Media and Politics, Political Communication, Intersection of Entertainment and Politics)
Juan D. González (Media, Inequality, and Change Center) 
David Greenberg (U.S Political and Media History, Media and Politics)
Amy Jordan (Health/Family Communication, Digital Inequality) 
Susan Keith  (Evolution of Journalistic Practice, Media Law and Ethics, Visual Journalism)
Rachel Kremen
Chenjerai Kumanyika (Social justice, Critical Media and Information, Culture and Society)
Deepa Kumar (Class, Gender, Race and Media, Middle East, War and Media, Social Movements)
Dafna Lemish (Children, Youth, and Leisure Culture)
Regina Marchi (Race, Class, Gender and Media, Social Movements & Media, Community-based Media, Latino Media and Pop Culture)
Steven Miller (Undergraduate Studies, Internships)
John V. Pavlik (New Media, Journalism and Society)
Caitlin Petre (Organizational Change, Media Power) 
Khadijah White  (Race, Gender, and Politics in the Media)
Todd Wolfson  (New Media and Social Movements, Cyber Ethnography, Poverty and Class Formation)

Library and Information Science

Warren Allen
Marc Aronson  (Literature for Young Readers, History of the Book, Fiction and Nonfiction)
Nicholas Belkin (Information Science)
Kaitlin L. Costello (Health Information Behavior, Social Media)
Marija Dalbello (Social History of Knowledge, Documents, Collections)
Michael Doyle 
Suchinthi Fernando (Social Media and Society Cluster)
Goun Kim (Information Retrieval, Multimedia Computing) 
Sunyoung Kim (Health, Wellness, and Interaction, Collaborative Design and Society)
E.E. Lawrence (Information Seeking, Information Ethics)
Michael Lesk (Information Science)
Lilia Pavlovsky (Information Science, Social Computing, Distance Learning)
Marie L. Radford (Interpersonal/Small Group Communication)
Rebecca Reynolds  (Computer-supported Collaborative Learning, New Media, Information and Digital Literacies, Information Seeking)
Charles Senteio (Healthcare Information)
Chirag Shah (Data Science, Applied Research, Information Retrieval)
Vivek Singh (Intersection of Big Data, Social Computing, and Multimodal Information Systems)
Anselm Spoerri (Information Science)
Gretchen Stahlman (Digital libraries, Human Information Behavior, Infrastructure) 
Ross J Todd (Information Science)
Joyce Valenza  (Children and Learning, Social and New Media)
Nina Wacholder (Natural Language Processing, Information Access, Organizing Information, Information Systems)

References

External links
SC&I homepage
Centers, Labs and Clusters

Journalism schools in the United States
School
Educational institutions established in 1982
1982 establishments in New Jersey